Tanjung Barat Station (TNT) is a class II railway station located in Tanjung Barat, Jagakarsa, South Jakarta. The station, which is located at an altitude of +44 m, is included in the Jakarta Operational Area I and only serves the KRL Commuterline route.

After being renovated in 2009, this station has different facilities and atmosphere compared to other stations. Bright orange and red colors dominate every corner of the room at this station, and there is also a signboard that guides prospective passengers to step. Coupled with 4 flat-screen televisions as a means of indicating the arrival of trains, it's not surprising that Tanjung Barat Station was used as a pilot station for all stations in Jabodetabek.

Building and layout 
This station has two railway tracks.

Services
The following is a list of train services at the Tanjung Barat Station

Passenger services 
 KAI Commuter

Supporting transportation

References

External links

South Jakarta
Railway stations in Jakarta